Eddie Boghous Demirjian is a Lebanese Armenian Orthodox politician.

Demirjian contested the 2009 Lebanese general election, standing as a candidate in the Zahle electoral district. He obtained 2 votes.

He again contested the Armenian Orthodox seat in Zahle in the 2018 Lebanese general election, standing on the list of Nicolas Fattouch. He was elected, having received 77 preference votes.

References

Members of the Parliament of Lebanon
Lebanese people of Armenian descent